Roeslerina is a genus of fungi in the Ascomycota phylum. The relationship of this taxon to other taxa within the phylum is unknown (incertae sedis), and it has not yet been placed with certainty into any class, order, or family.

The genus was circumscribed by Scott Alan Redhead in Canad. J. Bot. vol.62 on page 2514 in 1984 (published in 1985).

The genus name of Roeslerina is in honour of Leonard Roesler (1839–1910), who was a German-Austrian chemist and oenologist, he was Professor 
at the Technical University of Karlsruhe in 1867.

Species
As accepted by Species Fungorum;
 Roeslerina media 
 Roeslerina microspora 
 Roeslerina radicella

See also
 List of Ascomycota genera incertae sedis

References

External links
Index Fungorum

Ascomycota enigmatic taxa